Dunollie may refer to:

 Dunollie Castle, a castle in Scotland
 Dunollie, New Zealand, a town in the West Coast Region